, is a former member of the Japanese idol group HKT48, the captain of its Team KIV. She has also been a member of AKB48 and Watarirouka Hashiritai, and portrayed Kazue Kae in Tomie Unlimited (2011).

Career

2006ー2012: AKB48 and Watarirouka Hashiritai
Ota joined AKB48 as part of Original Team B, also known as 3rd Generation, along with her fellow teammates Kashiwagi Yuki and Watanabe Mayu. Team B made its debut in April 2007 and Ota was one of the other Team B members to debuted in AKB48 Theater. Later, she became senbatsu for the first time in Sakura no Hanabiratachi 2008. In October 2008, Akimoto Yasushi announced the creation of Watarirouka Hashiritai. Before Watarirouka Hashiritai debuted and Natsumi Hirajima was added, It was known as “Okashina Sisters” (お菓子なシスターズ) which consisting her, Nakagawa Haruka and Mayuyu, According to Akimoto Yasushi, The name Okashina Sisters is a pun on okashi (お菓子), meaning “sweets”, and okashii na (可笑しいな), meaning “amusing” or “strange” and Watarirouka Hashiritai officially debuted in January 2009, releasing their 1st Single  and double single “Hatsukoi Dash/Aoi Mirai”. In AKB48 13th Single Senbatsu Sousenkyo, Ota ranked 20th in final results and joined senbatsu for Iiwake Maybe, released on 26th August. On 23rd August 2009, during AKB48 Bunshin no Jutsu Tour / AKB104 Senbatsu Members Sokaku Matsuri (AKB48 分身の術ツアー/AKB104選抜メンバー組閣祭り), It was announced that she was transferred from Team B to Team A though it wasn’t took effect officially until May 2010. In AKB48 17th Single Senbatsu Election, Ota ranked 22nd Place and became center of Undergirls. In AKB48 22nd Single Senbatsu Sousenkyo ～Kotoshi mo Gachi desu～ (AKB48 22ndシングル選抜総選挙 ～今年もガチです～), She ranked 25th Place and remained Undergirls. In AKB48 27th Single Senbatsu Sousenkyo, She Came into 52nd place with 6,140 votes and became Future Girls.

2012-2017: Moved to HKT48
When AKB48 held a concert in Tokyo Dome, on the 1st Day of concert, Tomonobu Togasaki announced its second shuffle and Ota was permanently transferred to HKT48. She had her last activity with AKB48 in October 29 before moving to HKT48. She officially debuted with HKT48 in November 2012 and was promoted to Team H. In AKB48 32nd Single Senbatsu Sousenkyo, Ota ranked 43rd place with 16,401 votes and became Next Girls, On 11th January 2014, when HKT48 held their concert “HKT48 Kyushu 7 Prefecture Tour ~Kawaii Ko ni wa Tabi wo Saseyo~”, Ota was transferred to newly formed Team KIV and appointed captain. Meanwhile, Watarirouka Hashiritai held their final concert in 9th February 2014. In AKB48 37th Single Senbatsu Sousenkyo, she remained her position in Next Girls, ranking 42nd with 18,143 votes. In AKB48 41st Single Senbatsu Sousenkyo, in her last participation as a candidate, Ota ranked 41st place with 19,921 votes. She has not participate in 45th Single Senbatsu Sousenkyo in 2016 and 49th Single Senbatsu Sousenkyo in 2017 (since she graduated from HKT48 in April 2017).

2017: Graduating from HKT48
In 17th January 2017, Ota announced her graduation from HKT48 and HKT48 held a concert entitled “HKT48 Spring Kanto Tour 2017 ~We will show you true idols~ (HKT48 春の関東ツアー2017 ～本気のアイドルを見せてやる～)”. the Saitama concert in noontime served as her graduation concert from the group and officially graduated in April 10th 2017.

Personal life
Her official nickname is “Rabutan” or “Lovetan”.
She is friends with her fellow member Watanabe Mayu until her transfer to HKT48 in November 2012 (Announcement of her HKT48 transfer was during Tokyo Dome Concert in August 24th 2012).
 Her Hobbies: Things she can do by herself.
 Her Charm point is her single dimple and her single yaeba (pointed tooth).
Her Special Skill is Dieting.
She claimed herself to be Anime Otaku.
She is left-handed.
She and her close friend Mayu Watanabe are both 156cm tall.
She and her fellow transferred AKB48-turned-HKT48 member Sashihara Rino are often considered as 1st Generation members, both of them are promoted to Team H until Ota moved to newly-established Team KIV in January 2014.

Appearances

Stage units
 (Team B 1st Stage)
 (Team B 2nd Stage)
 (Team B 2nd Stage)
 (Team B 2nd Stage)
 (Team B 2nd Stage)

References

External links
 Official HKT48 profile 
 AKB Team Ogi profile 

1994 births
Living people
Musicians from Saitama Prefecture
Sony Music Entertainment Japan artists
AKB48 members
21st-century Japanese women singers
21st-century Japanese singers